Clivina bovillae is a species of ground beetle in the subfamily Scaritinae, native to Australia. It was described by Blackburn in 1890.

References

bovillae
Beetles described in 1890